CenterSpace Software, LLC. is a commercial software development company with headquarters in Corvallis, Oregon, USA, that produces numerical and statistical class libraries for the .NET Framework. CenterSpace also provides advanced software project consulting services.

CenterSpace Software produced the first commercial .NET numerical class library in March, 2003.

CenterSpace products include:

 NMath - A $1,595.
 NET numerical analysis package

Developers at CenterSpace Software wrote the book The Elements of C# Style.

CenterSpace won the Willamette Angel Conference in 2009.

CenterSpace accepts bitcoin for software and maintenance.

References

External links
 CenterSpace web site

Software companies based in Oregon
Privately held companies based in Oregon
Companies based in Corvallis, Oregon
Software companies of the United States